Gasterosiphon is a very small genus of sea snails, marine gastropod mollusks in the family Eulimidae.

Species
 Gasterosiphon deimatis (Koehler & Vaney, 1903) is the only species known to exist within this genus of gastropods.

References

External links
 To World Register of Marine Species

Eulimidae